Ryan Allen Reid (born April 24, 1985) is an American former professional baseball pitcher. He played in the Major League Baseball (MLB). Reid played for the Tampa Bay Rays, Pittsburgh Pirates, and the New York Mets. Mainly, Reid worked as a relief pitcher for these major teams.

Early life
Reid was born and raised in Portland, Maine. He played baseball at Deering High School with fellow future Major League Baseball player Ryan Flaherty.

Career

Tampa Bay Rays
The Tampa Bay Devil Rays drafted Reid in the 7th round of the 2006 MLB Draft out of James Madison University, where he played baseball for the Dukes under head coach Spanky McFarland. Nine seasons with the Rays, Reid went on to go and be a free agent for the 2012 minor league draft picks.

Pittsburgh Pirates
The Pirates signed Reid to a minor league contract after the 2012 season with an invitation to spring training as a non-roster player. He started the 2013 season with the Triple-A Indianapolis Indians. The Pirates promoted Reid to the major leagues on June 3, 2013, and he made his major league debut that day. Over the course of seven games From June 3 through July 4 that season, Reid pitched 11 innings for the Pirates. These would prove to be the only 11 innings of Reid’s major league career.

He was optioned back to Indianapolis on July 7 when A. J. Burnett returned from the disabled list.  

He returned to the Pirates on Aug 19.

Reid was designated for assignment by the Pirates on December 13, 2013.

New York Mets
He was claimed off waivers by the New York Mets on December 23, 2013. He then pitched in the 2014 season for the Triple-A team for the Mets.

Miami Marlins
Reid was a non-roster invitee to the Miami Marlins training camp in 2015 but did not make the final roster.

Post-Career 
Reid now

References

External links

1985 births
Living people
Deering High School alumni
Major League Baseball pitchers
Baseball players from Maine
Sportspeople from Portland, Maine
Pittsburgh Pirates players
James Madison Dukes baseball players
Hudson Valley Renegades players
Columbus Catfish players
Vero Beach Devil Rays players
Montgomery Biscuits players
Durham Bulls players
Indianapolis Indians players
Las Vegas 51s players
Peoria Javelinas players
Águilas del Zulia players
Tiburones de La Guaira players
American expatriate baseball players in Venezuela
Somerset Patriots players